Symphony in G can refer to:

List of symphonies in G minor
List of symphonies in G major

See also
List of symphonies by key